Bedford County is the name of several counties in the United States:

 Bedford County, Pennsylvania 
 Bedford County, Tennessee 
 Bedford County, Virginia

Bedford County may also refer to:

 Bedford County, Lower Canada, a historical county that preceded Missisquoi County, Quebec
 Bedfordshire, an English county